Haslum is a district in the municipality of Bærum, Norway. Its population (2007) is 6,041. 
Haslum is served by  Haslum station on the Kolsås Line (Kolsåsbanen) of Oslo Metro. It is situated between Avløs and Gjønnes.
Haslum is noted for Haslum Church (Haslum kirke) its medieval parish church, which is surrounded by a historic cemetery.

Haslum Church Gallery

References

External links
Haslum kirke (Norges Kirker by Sigrid Marie Christie, Håkon Christie)

Villages in Akershus
Bærum